The 1983 Soviet football championship was the 52nd seasons of competitive football in the Soviet Union. Dnepr Dnepropetrovsk won the Top League championship becoming the Soviet domestic champions for the first time.

Honours

Notes = Number in parentheses is the times that club has won that honour. * indicates new record for competition

Soviet Union football championship

Top League

First League

Second League (finals)

 [Oct 23 – Nov 12]

Finals 1

Finals 2

Finals 3

Top goalscorers

Top League
 Yuri Gavrilov (Spartak Moscow) – 18 goals

First League
Yuriy Bondarenko (Tavriya Simferopol) – 25 goals

References

External links
 1983 Soviet football championship. RSSSF